Estrela de Alagoas is a  municipality located in the western of the Brazilian state of Alagoas. Its population is 18,255 (2020) and its area is 264 km².

References

Municipalities in Alagoas